Dessau Hauptbahnhof is the main passenger station in the city of Dessau-Roßlau in the German state of Saxony-Anhalt.

Location 
The station is located to the south of the Elbe and to the west of central Dessau. It is a through station, orientated from the north-east to the south-west. Located on its south-eastern frontage is a stop for Dessau trams and buses operated by Dessauer Verkehrsgesellschaft, the city’s public transport operator.

History 

Dessau had an important role in rail transport from the early days of railways in Germany because of the crossing over the Elbe to its north. The first railway was opened on 1 September 1840 by the Berlin-Anhalt Railway Company. As early as 1911 the line to Bitterfeld was electrified experimentally. Because of the location of several industrial enterprises in the region, such as the Junkers aircraft factory, the railway was very important for rail freight.

In World War II, the station building was destroyed in an air raid on 7 March 1945 and was rebuilt up to 1952.

While the station was formerly a stop for InterRegio and Intercity trains, it is now almost exclusively served by regional transport as Dessau is not located on the busy Berlin–Halle and Magdeburg–Halle–Leipzig lines.

Between 2008 and 2011 a comprehensive renovation was carried out in the Roßlau/Dessau railway transport hub, including a major renovation of the track and overhead line equipment. The track plan of the station has been simplified, so that a speed of 160 km/h is now possible. On 5 December 2010, an electronic interlocking was brought into operation in Dessau.

On 13 December 2015, Dessau became a station on the network of the  S-Bahn Mitteldeutschland, which connects it with Leipzig.

Connections 
The station is used only by regional traffic. There have been no regular long-distance services since the opening of Berlin Hauptbahnhof in 2006. The Dessau-Wörlitz Railway is now a tourist railway and only operates during the summer season. The following services served the station in 2019, including IC services temporarily diverted from the Magdeburg–Halle line.

In public transport the  station is served by three tram and six bus routes. In addition all night bus routes start here.

Notes

References

 

Hauptbahnhof
Hauptbahnhof
Buildings and structures in Dessau-Roßlau
Railway stations in Germany opened in 1840
1840 establishments in Prussia